S.O.D. - Swammies On Deck is a first mixtape by rapper Tony Yayo hosted by G-Unit's DJ Whoo Kid. The mixtape features exclusive tracks from Tony Yayo with appearances by Maino, Max B, French Montana, Prodigy, Cory Gunz and Ransom. It was released for digital download on September 30, 2008 on datpiff.

Background
In 2009 the song "Face Off" (produced by Dream Team) contributed in the 50 Cent movie Before I Self Destruct.

Track list

2008 mixtape albums
Tony Yayo albums